David Mills (born January 24, 1959) is an American author. Mills has argued that science and religion cannot be successfully reconciled. He is best known for his book Atheist Universe which was published in 2004. In his book The God Delusion, evolutionary biologist Richard Dawkins cites Mills' writings as "admirable work." Mills claims in his books to rebut both young- and old-earth creation science, as well as Intelligent Design.

Mills has been interviewed on multiple talk shows including The Infidel Guy, WBAI in New York, on Air America Radio, and elsewhere. He is also a self-proclaimed member of the Rational Response Squad.

He lives in Huntington, West Virginia, and ran for the 2016 Democratic presidential nomination.

Published works

References

External links
Official Website of David Mills

1959 births
Living people
Critics of religions
American atheists
Candidates in the 2016 United States presidential election
21st-century American politicians